Wilhelm Schmid (24 February 1859, in Künzelsau, Kingdom of Württemberg – 6 November 1951) was a German classical scholar, born at Künzelsau.

After studies at the universities of Tübingen and Strassburg, he taught at Tübingen (1887 et seq.) and became a professor there in 1893. His publications include:
 Kulturgeschichtliche Zusammenhang und Bedeutung der griechischen Renaissance in der Römerzeit (1898) – On the cultural and historical context, and the importance of the Greek Renaissance in the Roman period.
 Zur Geschichte des griechischen Dithyrambus (1901) – The history of the Greek dithyramb.
 Verzeichniss der griechischen Handschriften der Königlichen Universitäts-Bibliothek Tübingen (1902) – Directory of Greek manuscripts of the Royal University Library in Tübingen.
 Revisions of Wilhelm von Christ; Geschichte der griechischen Litteratur (volume i, fifth edition, Munich, 1908; sixth edition, part i, 1912; volume ii, fifth edition, Munich, 1911–1915).

References 

1859 births
1951 deaths
People from Künzelsau
German classical scholars
Academic staff of the University of Tübingen
People from the Kingdom of Württemberg
German male writers